Mitchell "Mitch" Karpik (born 2 June 1995) is a New Zealand rugby union player who currently plays as a flanker for in New Zealand's domestic Mitre 10 Cup and the in the international Super Rugby competition.

Early career

Born and raised in Auckland, Karpik attended King's College in Otahuhu from 2009-2013, and was captain of the 1st XV. Karpik also grew up playing cricket for the Parnell Pirates and had a reputation as a formidable all rounder. Furthermore, during High School Karpik; along with future agent Scott Bevin, formed the all conquering Greenbank Javelin academy, garnering success for many years. After graduating from high school, he played his club rugby in the Auckland region and played for the  under-20 and developmental teams.

Senior career

He received his first taste of provincial rugby with  during the 2015 ITM Cup, where he played a starring role in their run to the Premiership final. He played 11 of Auckland's 12 games during the campaign and scored 3 tries in what was to be his only season with them.

At the conclusion of the 2015 season, it was announced that Karpik would be joining the Bay of Plenty Steamers for 2016. Unfortunately for both parties, a knee injury sustained at the beginning of the year ruled him of the entire campaign which saw the Steamers eliminated at the semi-final stage after finishing 4th on the Championship log.

Super Rugby

His debut season at provincial level with Auckland was enough to convince the Hamilton-based  Super Rugby franchise to hand him a contract for the 2016 Super Rugby season. A knee injury picked up in pre-season match against the  saw him miss the entire campaign. Despite this, he was retained in the squad for 2017.

International

Karpik represented both New Zealand Schools and New Zealands Schools Barbarians while at King's College and was also a member of the New Zealand Under-20 side which won the 2015 World Rugby Under 20 Championship in Italy.

Career Honours

New Zealand Under-20

World Rugby Under 20 Championship - 2015

Super Rugby Statistics

References

1995 births
Living people
New Zealand rugby union players
Rugby union flankers
Auckland rugby union players
Bay of Plenty rugby union players
Chiefs (rugby union) players
People educated at King's College, Auckland
Rugby union players from Auckland
Ngāti Rongomaiwahine people
Ngāti Kahungunu people